Reece Raymond Whitby (born 29 May 1964) is an Australian politician. He has been a Labor member of the Western Australian Legislative Assembly since the 2017 state election, representing Baldivis. Shortly after the 2017 election, Whitby was appointed by Premier of Western Australia Mark McGowan as Parliamentary Secretary to the Treasurer and Minister for Energy and Finance, and as Parliamentary Secretary to the Minister for Environment and Disability Services. Whitby was successfully re-elected to the seat of Baldivis in the 2021 state election, and he was appointed to the Second McGowan Ministry, becoming the Minister of Emergency Services; Racing and Gaming, Small Business and Volunteering.

Whitby was raised in Balga, Western Australia, and attended North Balga Primary School and Greenwood Senior High School. Before entering politics he was a journalist at the South Western Times in Bunbury, the Australian Broadcasting Corporation, Nine Network and Seven Network. In 2008 and 2013 he ran unsuccessfully as the Labor candidate for the state Legislative Assembly electoral district of Morley.

Whitby is married to District Court of Western Australia Judge Natalie Whitby. They have four children.

Whitby is one of six Labor MP's in the current state parliament that is not factionally aligned as of 2021.

Whitby worked for the Seven Network before his political career.

References

1964 births
Living people
Australian Labor Party members of the Parliament of Western Australia
Members of the Western Australian Legislative Assembly
21st-century Australian politicians